Stanisław Fryźlewicz (born 8 April 1944) is a Polish former ice hockey player. He played for Podhale Nowy Targ, Legia Warsaw, and ŁKS Łódź during his career. He also played for the Polish national team at the 1972 Winter Olympics and multiple World Championships. Fryźlewicz won the Polish league championship six times during his career: in 1967 with Legia, and 1969 and from 1971 to 1974 with Podhale. After his playing career he coached Podhale.

References

External links
 

1944 births
Living people
Ice hockey players at the 1972 Winter Olympics
Legia Warsaw (ice hockey) players
Olympic ice hockey players of Poland
People from Nowy Targ
Podhale Nowy Targ players
Polish ice hockey forwards
Sportspeople from Lesser Poland Voivodeship